MN55 may refer to one of the following:

Minnesota State Highway 55
MN55 (apple) cultivar developed at University of Minnesota